Tulipwood is the pinkish yellowish wood yielded from the tulip tree, Liriodendron tulipifera.

Tulipwood may also refer to:

Harpullia, trees native to rainforest margins in Australia
 Harpullia pendula, tulipwood or tulip lancewood, a small to medium-sized rainforest tree from Australia
 Dalbergia cearensis, a small tree endemic to Brazil
 Liriodendron tulipifera, tulip tree or tulipwood, a tree native to North America
Tulipwood (Somerset, New Jersey), a historic home listed on the U.S. National Register of Historic Places, in New Jersey

See also
 Lancewood (disambiguation)